William Edmond Armitage (September 6, 1830 – December 7, 1873) was a bishop of the Episcopal Church of the United States.

Born in New York City, Armitage graduated from Columbia College in 1849 and the General Theological Seminary in 1852. He was ordained deacon at the Church of the Transfiguration, New York, on June 27, 1852, by Bishop Carlton Chase and priest at St. Mark's, Augusta, Maine, on September 27, 1854, by Bishop George Burgess.

Armitage's first ministry position was as assistant at St. John's in Portsmouth, New Hampshire. He was then called to St. Mark's, Augusta, Maine, until called to be rector of St. John's, Detroit, Michigan, where he was when elected to the episcopate. He received his doctorate in divinity from Columbia College in 1866.

Armitage was consecrated at St. John's Detroit on December 6, 1866, by bishops Kemper, McCoskry, H. W. Lee, Whipple, J. C. Talbot, Coxe, Clarkson, Kerfoot, and Cummins, together with Bishop Cronyn, the Bishop of Huron, Canada. He was coadjutor bishop to Jackson Kemper (1866–1870) and on the death of Kemper served as the second Bishop of Wisconsin (1870–1873).

Armitage died at St. Luke's Hospital in New York on December 7, 1873, and his remains are buried in Detroit, Michigan, at Elmwood Cemetery.

External links 
 Documents by W. E. Armitage from Project Canterbury
 Grave from Find a Grave

1830 births
1873 deaths
Columbia College (New York) alumni
19th-century Anglican bishops in the United States
Burials at Elmwood Cemetery (Detroit)
General Theological Seminary alumni
Episcopal bishops of Milwaukee